Ali Kalantari (born 21 March 1968, in Shiraz) is a former Iranian football player and now coach who is currently head coach of Fajr Sepasi.

Honours
Fajr Sepasi
Azadegan League: 2020–21

References

External links
 Profile: Ali Kalantari

Living people
1968 births
Iranian footballers
Iranian football managers
People from Shiraz
Association football midfielders
Sportspeople from Fars province
Bargh Shiraz F.C. managers